Chasing Maria Menounos is an American reality television series that debuted March 18, 2014, on Oxygen. The show follows the lives of Maria Menounos and long-time boyfriend Keven, who have been living together unmarried for over 15 years with Maria's parents, Costas and Litsa, and Keven's lifetime best friend from Boston, Joe Gear. The show chronicles Menounos's career in the entertainment industry and family matters. These include living with traditional Greek immigrant parents that insist she marry and have children, and working her jobs such as managing an online broadcast network, AfterBuzz TV, with boyfriend Keven.

Cast
Maria Menounos
Keven Undergaro
Costas Menounos
Litsa Menounos
Joe Gear

Episodes

References

External links

2010s American reality television series
2014 American television series debuts
2014 American television series endings
English-language television shows
Oxygen (TV channel) original programming